Pancreas transcription factor 1 subunit alpha is a protein that in humans is encoded by the PTF1A gene.

Function 

This gene encodes a protein that is a component of the pancreas transcription factor 1 complex (PTF1) and is known to have a role in mammalian pancreatic development. The protein plays a role in determining whether cells allocated to the pancreatic buds continue towards pancreatic organogenesis or revert to duodenal fates. The protein is thought to be involved in the maintenance of exocrine pancreas-specific gene expression including elastase 1 and amylase. Mutations in this gene cause cerebellar agenesis and loss of expression is seen in ductal type pancreas cancers.

References

Further reading